Xavier Maniguet  (17 October 1946 – 22 March 2009) was a French medical writer, doctor and intelligence service (DGSE) agent.

Along with Roland Verge, Gerald Andries and Jean-Michel Barcelo, Maniguet bombed the Rainbow Warrior in New Zealand's Auckland Harbour on 10 July 1985.

A specialist in aviation medicine, hyperbaric medicine and sports medicine, he died on 23 March 2009 at the controls of a light plane on the glacier near St. Sorlin St. Sorlin d'Arves, after taking off from the airfield in Meribel (France).

Bibliography
 L'Aventure pour l'aventure, Carrère-Lafon, 1986
 Survivre, comment vaincre en milieu hostile, Albin Michel, 1988, (Survival, how to prevail in hostile environments, Facts On File Inc, 1994)
 Naufragés. Comment survivre en mer, Filipacchi, 1989
 Le Guide de l'homme d'action, Albin Michel, 1990
 Les Dents de la mort, Robert Laffont, J'ai Lu, 1991 (The Jaws of Death: Sharks As Predator, Man As Prey, HarperCollins, 1992) 
 Les Énergies du stress, Robert Laffont, 1994
 La Montagne et vous, guide pratique, Albin Michel, 2000
 Mieux être. Vivre longtemps en pleine forme, sans gélules et sans stress, 2005
 French Bomber. Enfin la vérité sur le Rainbow Warrior, 2007
 Bien vivre avec son stress. Les bienfaits de la méthode Emostress, De Vecchi, 2009

References

1946 births
2009 deaths
French military personnel
French medical writers
Aviators killed in aviation accidents or incidents in France
Sinking of the Rainbow Warrior